Tião Carreiro & Pardinho (also known as  Tião Carreiro e Pardinho) is a Brazilian sertanejo musical duo.

Tião Carreiro (real name: José Dias Nunes), born in Monte Azul, in the Brazilian state of Minas Gerais, started to learn how to play the acoustic guitar at a very young age. Later, only 13, he went to work in the Giglio Circus, where he made a music pair with his cousin Waldomiro. The circus owner encouraged Tião to learn the viola caipira (a kind of steel ten-string acoustic guitar). Tião Carreiro played along with various other violeiros (viola caipira players that create música caipira or Brazilian country music).

He reached fame with Pardinho (real name: Antônio Henrique de Lima), consolidating the music double as Tião Carreiro e Pardinho. Alongside Pardinho, Tião Carreiro is credited as the inventor of the Pagode (not to be confused with the Pagode style of Samba), the rural Pagode (Pagode Caipira).

Influenced 

Among the violeiros such as César Menotti & Fabiano, Chitãozinho & Xororó, Milionário e José Rico among others, Tião Carreiro e Pardinho are viewed as one of the most influential songwriters/singers of the Música Sertaneja style of Brazilian popular music.

Major Hits 

Between their major hits we have: Pagode em Brasília (en.: "Pagode in Brasília"), their first success (recorded in 1959), Boi Soberano (en.: "Sovereign Ox"), Filhinho de Papai (en.: "Daddy's Little Son") and Cochilou o Cacimbo Cai (en.: "If You Sleep You Lose the Pipe"). The complete discography sums to up to 45 albums, being, nowadays, considered to be one of the most influential Brazilian caipira pairs of all time.

Discography (albums) 

 1961- Rei do Gado
 1962- Meu Carro é Minha Viola
 1963- Casinha da Serra
 1964- Linha de Frente
 1964- Repertório de Ouro
 1965- Os Reis do Pagode
 1966- Boi Soberano
 1967- Pagode na Praça
 1967- Os Grandes Sucessos de Tião Carreiro e Pardinho
 1967- Rancho dos Ipês
 1968- Encantos da Natureza
 1968- Tião Carreiro e Pardinho e Seus Grandes Sucessos
 1969- Em Tempo de Avanço
 1970- Sertão em Festa
 1970- Show
 1970- A Força do Perdão
 1971- Abrindo Caminho
 1972- Hoje eu Não Posso Ir
 1973- Sucessos de Tião Carreiro e Pardinho
 1973- Viola Cabocla
 1973- A Caminho do Sol
 1974- Modas de Viola Classe "A"
 1974- Esquina da Saudade
 1974- Tangos em Dueto
 1975- Modas de Viola Classe "A" - vol. 2
 1975- Duelo de Amor
 1976- Os Grandes Sucessos de Tião Carreiro e Pardinho vol. 2
 1976- É Isto que o Povo Quer - Tião Carreiro em Solos de Viola Caipira
 1976- Rio de Pranto
 1977- Pagodes
 1977- Rancho do Vale
 1978- Terra Roxa
 1978- Viola Divina
 1979- Disco de Ouro
 1979- Golpe de Mestre
 1979- Pagodes vol. 02
 1979- Tião Carreiro em Solo de Viola Caipira
 1979- Seleção de Ouro
 1980- Homem até Debaixo d´água
 1981- Prato do Dia
 1981- 4 Azes - Tião Carreiro & Paraiso & Pardinho & Pardal
 1981- Modas de Viola Classe "A" - vol 3
 1982- Navalha na Carne
 1983- No Som da Viola
 1984- Modas de Viola Classe "A" - vol 4
 1985- Felicidade
 1986- Estrela de Ouro
 1988- A Majestade do Pagode
 1992- O Fogo e a Brasa
 1994- Som da Terra
 1994- Som da Terra - vol. 2 - Pagodes
 1994- Som da Terra - vol. 3 - Modas de Viola
 1996- Saudades de Tião Carreiro - Diversas Duplas
 1998- Sucessos de Ouro - Tião Carreiro e Pardinho - As Românticas
 1999- Popularidade
 2001- Warner 25 anos

Sertanejo music groups
Sertanejo musicians
Musical groups established in 1958
Brazilian musical duos
1958 establishments in Brazil